Hong Kong competed at the 2008 Summer Olympics in Beijing.

Hong Kong was also the host of the equestrian competitions at the Hong Kong Equestrian Venues.

Athletics

Men

Women

Badminton

Cycling

Road
Wu Kin San is the first Hong Kong athlete to successfully complete the cycling road race.

Track
Omnium

Mountain biking

Equestrian

Hong Kong competitors will themselves be taking part in the Olympic Equestrian Events for the first time. Jennifer Lee withdrew due to health problems with her horse, Mr Burns.

Show jumping

Fencing

Men

Women

Rowing

Men

Women

Qualification Legend: FA=Final A (medal); FB=Final B (non-medal); FC=Final C (non-medal); FD=Final D (non-medal); FE=Final E (non-medal); FF=Final F (non-medal); SA/B=Semifinals A/B; SC/D=Semifinals C/D; SE/F=Semifinals E/F; QF=Quarterfinals; R=Repechage

Sailing

Men

Women

M = Medal race; EL = Eliminated – did not advance into the medal race; CAN = Race cancelled;

Shooting

Men

Swimming

Women

Table tennis

Men's singles

Women's singles

Team

Triathlon

Officials
IOC Member & NOC President: Timothy Fok
Hon. Secretary General: Pang, Chung
Chef de Mission: Hui, Victor
Deputy Chef de Mission - Sailing: Kwok, Chi Leung Karl
Headquarters Official: Lau, Chiang Chu Vivien
Headquarters Official: Leung, Mee Lee
Chief Medical Officer: Chang, Wai Julian
Deputy Chef de Mission - Equestrian: Eckgans, Sacha Johannes
NOC Guest: Conway, Anthony Francis Martin
Medical Officials: Yeung, Sai Mo Simon
Medical Officials: Look, Ka Mei Debbie
Medical Officials: Cheuk, Wai Ling Phoebe
Medical Officials: Long, Qinyan
Medical Officials: Xu, Zhengzheng
Youth Camp Participants: Li, Chung Him Samuel
Youth Camp Participants: Woo, Wing Tung

See also
 Hong Kong, China at the 2008 Summer Paralympics

References

External links
Hong Kong, China Delegation 2008 Beijing - List

Nations at the 2008 Summer Olympics
2008
2008 in Hong Kong sport